Khaled Khalifa Al-Shammari is a Kuwaiti Olympic middle-distance runner. He represented his country in the men's 1500 meters at the 1980 Summer Olympics. His time was a 3:57.55.

References 

1957 births
Living people
Kuwaiti male middle-distance runners
Olympic athletes of Kuwait
Athletes (track and field) at the 1980 Summer Olympics